Napster is a music streaming service based in Seattle, Washington. Napster started as an audio search engine named Aladdin that was purchased by Listen.com in May 2001 and became the basis for its new streaming service, called Rhapsody, that launched in December of the same year. Based on the Open Music Model principles, Rhapsody was the first streaming on-demand music subscription service to offer unlimited access to a large library of digital music for a flat monthly fee. In August 2003, internet media behemoth RealNetworks, anticipating the launch of Apple's iTunes store, acquired Rhapsody. On April 6, 2010, Rhapsody relaunched as a standalone company, separate from former parent RealNetworks. Downloaded files come with restrictions on their use, enforced by Helix, Rhapsody's version of digital rights management enforced on AAC+ or WMA files. 

On August 25, 2020, Rhapsody International and the Napster name were sold to virtual reality concerts company MelodyVR for $70 million, which renamed itself Napster Group PLC following the takeover. On May 10, 2022, Napster was sold to Hivemind and Algorand.

History

Early days
In 1999, Tim Bratton, J.P. Lester, Sylvain Rebaud, Alexandre Brouaux, Nick Sincaglia and Dave Lampton were working on a new streaming audio engine. This engine was commercially deployed in the TuneTo.com customized radio service, and was also used in their "celestial jukebox" prototype, called Aladdin.

Rhapsody
In April 2001, TuneTo.com was acquired by Listen.com, a startup founded in San Francisco by author and entrepreneur Rob Reid, that had built a large online music directory. Aladdin was transformed into the Rhapsody music service during the summer and fall of 2001 and was launched on December 3, 2001. 

Rhapsody was the first streaming on-demand music subscription service to offer unlimited access to a large library of digital music for a flat monthly fee, a concept advocated by business theories such as the Open Music Model. At launch, Rhapsody's library was formed of content mostly from Naxos Records and several independent labels. Over the next several months of 2002, they secured licenses from EMI, BMG, Warner Bros. Records, and Sony to add their music to the service. In July 2002, Rhapsody added Universal Records to their catalog, signing the last of the five major record labels of the time. 

RealNetworks announced plans to acquire Listen.com on April 21, 2003, one week before the launch of the iTunes Music Store on April 28, 2003. The transaction closed on August 3, 2003. The Rhapsody service was briefly known as RealRhapsody shortly after the acquisition, but was since shortened back to "Rhapsody". 

By 2004, some blogs providing sharing of playlists with comments, with names such as "Rhapsody Radish".
In late 2007, Music On the Go (MOG) partnered with Rhapsody to allow Rhapsody subscribers to access all of Rhapsody's content through MOG. In August 2007 RealNetworks formed a joint venture with music broadcast network MTV named Rhapsody America. The underpinning software running the service would come from MTV's Urge, a discontinued music service MTV developed in partnership with Microsoft.

Spinoff
In February 2010, RealNetworks announced their intention to restructure Rhapsody into a fully independent business. Recent problems with the online music subscription service prompted the CEO to make "crucial decisions and think some things through". During this period, dropping the subscription service was considered, but he felt it wasn't the right decision at the time. Instead, the whole Rhapsody team thought of ways to revamp the struggling company and in turn dropped RealNetworks as parent of the company. This was a very risky decision, as the company needed the support, but gained the support of MTV Networks and Viacom, and other independent companies. Since independence, Rhapsody has started the revamping process with a new logo and subscription price changes. 

As of January 2011, Rhapsody president Jon Irwin told Reuters the on-demand subscription music service had more than 750,000 subscribers, having added more than 100,000 since becoming an independent company. At that date Rhapsody had a catalog of 11,000,000 songs. 

On August 3, 2011, Rhapsody announced that from October 2011 they would no longer re-license DRMed music bought before July 2008. 

On October 3, 2011, Rhapsody announced plans to acquire Napster with the deal to be completed by November. 

On May 6, 2014, Rhapsody announced its parent company made its first outside investment and led a Series B round for Dubset Media, the operator of streaming music site Thefuture.fm.  Terms of the deal were not disclosed. 

On April 21, 2016, Rhapsody named its first CEO, Mike Davis. Davis is the first CEO of Rhapsody International, which is the parent company to Rhapsody and Napster.

Napster rebranding
On July 14, 2016, Rhapsody phased out the Rhapsody brand in favor of Napster and has since branded its service internationally as Napster.

Acquisition by MelodyVR 
On August 25, 2020, Napster was sold to virtual reality concerts company MelodyVR.

Acquisition by Algorand
On May 10, 2022, Napster was sold to the blockchain company Algorand and the crypto-focused investment firm Hivemind. Following the sale, Emmy Lovell was announced as CEO of Napster. 

On June 8, 2022, Napster released a new version of its music streaming app with refreshed branding.

Rhapsody MP3 
In addition to its subscription service, Rhapsody used to sell 256 kbit/s constant bit rate MP3s individually, Rhapsody has since canceled the sales of downloadable songs to focus on its core streaming service.

Rhapsody software
The Rhapsody Music Software, was a free program to help organize music collections, and synchronize them in MP3 portable media players (PMP) with the Rhapsody subscription service. It competed with Apple Inc.'s iTunes software. , the latest version of the software is Rhapsody 4.  Rhapsody 5 was delayed because the Rhapsody product team felt the company's future success would be in mobile apps and started working on apps for iOS (iPhone), Android, BlackBerry OS, and Verizon Wireless's app store, all of which were deployed as of 2011. Following the launch of the mobile apps Rhapsody Music Software was discontinued.

See also 
 List of Internet radio stations
 List of online music databases
 Napster
 Napster (pay service)

Notes

 

Music streaming services
Online music stores of the United States